"Lump" is a song by alternative rock band the Presidents of the United States of America. It was released in 1995 and featured on their self-titled debut album (1995). The song reached number one on the US Billboard Modern Rock Tracks chart same year. 
Composer Chris Ballew said that the lyrics combined his own history of having a benign tumor in the head with a vision he had of a woman in a swamp, while employing the word "lump" because Ballew was fond of it. The musical part was described by Ballew as him "trying to write a Buzzcocks song". Ballew considers it his favorite composition.

Later in the same year, it debuted on the Album Rock Tracks chart, and went on to hit number seven. The song is featured in the video games Rock Band 2, the Nintendo DS version of Band Hero, Just Dance and Saints Row IV. It has additionally been covered or remade by several artists such as The Johnstones and "Weird Al" Yankovic.

Musical style
Musically, Lump is a grunge, pop-punk, alternative rock, and post-grunge song.

Critical reception
Pan-European magazine Music & Media wrote, "Taken from the band's debut album, Lump clocks in at just over two minutes. And it's so cool you could play it twice in
place of those dismal four-minute rock operas churned out by other US-rockers. Full points to Chris Ballew's tongue-in cheek vocals–one of the best things to happen to alternative rock this year." David Sinclair from The Times commented, "An intriguing amalgamation of Nirvana-influenced riffs and Weezer-ish harmony vocals, it is a post-grunge formula served up with lashings of oddball humour in place of the usual angst: Lump sat alone in a boggy marsh/Totally motionless except for her heart/Mud flowed up into Lump's pyjamas/She totally confused all the passing piranhas."

Music video
The music video for "Lump", directed by Roman Coppola, takes place in a "boggy marsh" (as the lyrics state). The video shows the band singing in a swamp as well as on the stern of a large barge in Elliott Bay interspersed with a silhouette scene of the band performing.

Another video was also made for the song. This version, commonly referred to as "Lump 2", was considered too disturbing and dark to be aired on MTV (reflecting the band's grunge and post-grunge origins). It features the band performing on a dark stage while various people lip sync the lines "She's lump!" during the chorus. This version can be found on "Ten Year Super Bonus Special Anniversary Edition" of the Presidents of the United States of America's debut album, and on their YouTube channel (in low definition)

Track listings and formats

 European maxi-single
 "Lump"  – 2:12
 "Carolyn's Bootie"  – 2:15
 "Candy Cigarette"  – 2:00

 Australian CD single
 "Lump"  – 2:12
 "Carolyn's Bootie"  – 2:15
 "Candy Cigarette"  – 2:00
 "Twig in the Wind"  – 2:54

 UK 7-inch vinyl and cassette
 "Lump"  – 2:12
 "Wake Up"  – 2:37

 European CD single and Dutch 12-inch vinyl
 "Lump"  – 2:12
 "Carolyn's Bootie"  – 2:15

Credits and personnel
Credits and personnel are adapted from the "Lump" US promo CD liner notes.
 Chris Ballew – producer, vocals, two-string basitar
 Dave Dederer – producer, three-string guitbass, vocals
 Jason Finn – drums, vocals
 Conrad Uno – producer, recording at Egg Studios
 Mark Guenther – sound engineer
 David Kahne – mixing
 Steve Culp – mixing engineer
 Wally Traugott – mastering at Capitol Studios/Tower Mastering

Charts and certifications

Weekly charts

Year-end charts

Certifications and sales

Parodies and covers
 "Weird Al" Yankovic released a parody version of the song known as "Gump", a joking tribute to Forrest Gump. Notably, the last line of this parody, "and that's all I have to say about that" would later be used by The Presidents of the United States of America in their subsequent live performances of the song.
 Comedian Brian Posehn recorded a skit for his 2020 comedy metal album Grandpa Metal called "My Phone Call with Weird Al", featuring Yankovic, which references both "Lump" and "Gump", in which Posehn is trying to get Yankovic's permission to record a parody called "Trump" about president of the United States of America Donald Trump, and Yankovic unsuccessfully tries to inform Posehn that "Gump" is a parody of the Presidents of the United States of America song "Lump".
 ApologetiX also recorded a parody entitled "Plump".
 Canadian ska punk band The Johnstones covered "Lump" on their 2008 EP SEX.
 The Blackout also covered "Lump" and it features on the end of the group's album, Hope, released in 2011.

See also
 Number one modern rock hits of 1995
 List of RPM Rock/Alternative number-one singles (Canada)

References

External links
 
 

1995 singles
Buzzcocks
Music videos directed by Roman Coppola
The Presidents of the United States of America (band) songs
Songs written by Chris Ballew
Post-grunge songs